Sidney Green may refer to:
Sidney Green (basketball) (born 1961), American basketball player
Sidney Green (politician), Canadian politician
Sidney Faithorn Green, British clergyman
Sidney Greene, Baron Greene of Harrow Weald
Sid Greene (1906–1972), comic-book artist
Sid Green (writer), comedy writer with Dick Hills